Grey Pilgrim might refer to one of the following:

A name for Gandalf, a fictional character in J. R. R. Tolkien's The Lord of the Rings series
"The Grey Pilgrim," a book by J. M. Hayes